Associated British Foods plc (ABF) is a British multinational food processing and retailing company headquartered in London, England. Its ingredients division is the world's second-largest producer of both sugar and baker's yeast and a major producer of other ingredients including emulsifiers, enzymes and lactose. Its grocery division is a major manufacturer of both branded and private label grocery products and includes the brands Mazola, Ovaltine, Ryvita, Jordans and Twinings. Its retail division, Primark, has some 384 stores across several countries, predominantly Germany, Ireland, Netherlands, Spain, and the UK. ACH Food Companies is an American subsidiary.

Associated British Foods is listed on the London Stock Exchange and is a constituent of the FTSE 100 Index.

History 
The company was founded by Canadian W. Garfield Weston in 1935, initially as Food Investments Limited, with the name changing to Allied Bakeries Limited a month later.

Between 1935 and 1956, ten national and regional bakery companies were acquired by Allied, including Barrett and Pomeroy, and London and Provincial Bakeries. The largest acquisition at this time was in 1955 when Allied bought the British operations of the Aerated Bread Company, founded in 1862. This acquisition included both the bakery business and the chain of cafeterias, the A.B.C. Tearooms. Allied paid $8.1 million for A.B.C. At that time, Allied had a large share of the UK baked goods market. Allied's market share prior to acquiring A.B.C. was 10% of all UK bread production and the sale of 20 million biscuits per day. Allied's sales the year prior were $154 million with profits of $12.6 million in current dollars). With the acquisition of A.B.C., Allied almost doubled its share of the UK's bread market by the end of the decade.

Allied, under its new name, adopted in 1960, of Associated British Foods, continued to run A.B.C. as a separate brand after its takeover, with a major A.B.C. bakery in Camden Town, London. This closed in 1982 and the A.B.C. name was retired.

In 1963, Associated British Foods acquired Fine Fare, then a leading British supermarket chain. Following the death of the founder in 1978, control of the company was passed on to his son Garry, while the North American operations fell to his son Galen.

The company sold Fine Fare in 1986 and in 1991, went on to acquire British Sugar. In 1997, ABF sold its retail operations in Ireland (including Northern Ireland) to Tesco. These businesses were: Quinnsworth and Crazy Prices in the Republic of Ireland and Stewarts Supermarket Limited and Crazy Prices in Northern Ireland. This sale also included the Stewarts Winebarrel off-licence chain, Lifestyle Sports & Leisure Ltd (a retail sports and leisure business), Kingsway Fresh Foods (a meat processing facility) and Daily Wrap Produce (a fruit and vegetable packaging plant).

In May 1994, Greggs acquired the Bakers Oven chain from the company.

In 2000, the company sold its interests in Burton's Biscuits. In 2002, it acquired the Mazola corn oil, Argo and Kingsford's cornstarch, Karo and Golden Griddle syrups, and Henri's dressing brands, along with several Canadian brands, from Unilever; in 2004, it acquired the Tone's spice business and Fleischman yeast business from Burns Philp; and in 2007, it purchased Patak's Indian food business.

On 26 March 2011, Associated British Foods, and its parent company Wittington Investments, were targeted over tax avoidance by UK Uncut during anti-cuts protests. The tax avoidance scheme involved moving capital between ABF/Primark and the affiliated Luxembourg entity ABF European Holdings & Co SNC by means of interest-free loans, avoiding tax of about £9.7 million per year. The protest took the form of a mass sit-in in Fortnum & Mason.

In February 2013, the firm denied "illegal and immoral" tax evasion after it was accused by an international charity of moving its profits outside Zambia to reduce its tax bill. ActionAid said Zambia Sugar, a unit of AB Foods, had made profits of $123 million since 2007, but had paid "virtually no corporate tax" in Zambia.

In October 2013, the company denied being involved in unscrupulous uses of land, in an article containing reports of forced evictions by other companies.

Operations

Brands 

 Allinson
 Argo cornstarch
 Aladino Peanut Butter
 Burgen
 Blue Dragon
 Capullo
 Dorset Cereals
 Dromedary cake mixes
 Elephant Atta
 Fleischmann's Yeast
 High5
 Jordans cereals
 Lucky Boat Noodles
 Karo corn syrup
 Kingsford's cornstarch
 Kingsmill bread
 Mazola corn oil
 Ovaltine (except in the United States, where Nestlé owns the brand)
 Patak's
 Pride
 Ryvita
 Silver Spoon
 Sunblest
 Thai Lotus Pastes
 Tolly Boy Rice
 Twinings

Subsidiaries 

 AB Agri Ltd
 AB Enzymes - an ABFI Company
 AB Sugar
 AB Mauri,  bakery ingredients
 Abitec Corporation - an ABFI Company
 Abitec Ltd
 ACH Food Companies (AC HUMKO from 1995 to 2000), an American subsidiary of Associated British Foods, previously part of Kraft Foods from 1952 to 1995.
 ACH Food México
 Allied Bakeries - a division of ABF Grain Products Ltd
 Allied Mills
 British Sugar
 Frontier Agriculture (50% joint venture with Cargill)
 George Weston Foods
 G Costa: sauces and specialty foods
 Illovo Sugar
 OHLY - an ABFI Company
 PGP International, Inc. - an ABFI Company
 Primark – known as Penneys in the Republic of Ireland
 SPI Pharma, Inc. - an ABFI Company
 Stratas Foods LLC, a 50/50 joint venture between ABF's American subsidiary ACH and fellow American food corporation Archer Daniels Midland
 Wander AG
 Westmill Foods

Board of directors
Charles Sinclair, Chairman.
George G. Weston, Chief Executive Officer.
John Bason, Finance Director.
Peter Smith, Independent non-executive director.
Michael Jay, Baron Jay of Ewelme, Independent non-executive director.
Timothy Clarke, Independent non-executive director.
Javier Ferrán, Independent non-executive director.
Emma Adamo, Independent non-executive director.

Controlling shareholder 
54.5% of ABF is owned by Wittington Investments. 79.2% of the share capital of Wittington Investments is owned by the Garfield Weston Foundation, which is one of the UK's largest grant-making charitable trusts, and the remainder is owned by members of the Weston family. Wittington Investments also owns Fortnum & Mason and Heal & Son.  George G. Weston became chief executive of ABF on 1 April 2005, and Galen Weston, the chief executive of George Weston Ltd., is a non-executive director. Garth Weston is Regional President of AB Mauri.

See also

References

External links

 
Food manufacturers based in London
Companies listed on the London Stock Exchange
Food and drink companies established in 1935
Weston family
Multinational food companies
Multinational companies headquartered in England
British companies established in 1935
1935 establishments in England
Fortnum & Mason